Georgia is an unincorporated community in Spice Valley Township, Lawrence County, Indiana.

History
Georgia was platted in 1853. The community was named after the state of Georgia. A post office was established at Georgia in 1857, and remained in operation until it was discontinued in 1917.

Geography

References

Unincorporated communities in Lawrence County, Indiana
Unincorporated communities in Indiana
1853 establishments in Indiana
Populated places established in 1853